The 2019 IFSC Combined Qualifier was an Olympic Qualifying Event. It was held from 28 November to 1 December 2019 in Toulouse, France. It was organized by the French Federation of Sport Climbing and Mountaineering or FFME (Federation Francaise Montagne Escalade). The athletes competed in combined format of three disciplines: speed, bouldering, and lead, simulating the 2020 Olympics format. Six athletes per gender would qualify for the 2020 Tokyo Olympics through this event. The winner for men was Kokoro Fujii and for women was Futaba Ito.

Qualification for the 2020 Summer Olympics

The six best climbers of the combined event automatically qualify for the 2020 Summer Olympics, where sport climbing will make its debut. There are six spots available per gender, with a maximum of two spots per country. Japan had already filled their maximum quota of two athletes per gender, so no more athletes were going to qualify for the Olympics through this event.

The qualifiers for the 2020 Summer Olympics from the 2019 IFSC Combined Qualifier event were:

Competition format 
In the qualification round each of the twenty competitors competed in speed climbing, bouldering and lead climbing. The scores were multiplied and the 8 competitors with the lowest total scores proceeded to the final round.

In speed climbing, climbers raced against each other's in pairs on a standardized wall of 15m in height. In the qualification round, climbers had two runs on two different lanes; their best times were recorded and used for seeding placement in the final round. In the final round, climbers raced head-to-head with the fastest winning.

In bouldering, climbers needed to top boulder problems set on 4.5m-high wall within a certain amount of time. In the qualification round, climbers were faced with 4 boulder problems and given 5 minutes on each problem to top them. The final round had 3 boulder problems to top within a 4 minutes time limit.

In lead climbing, climbers were given a route set on 15m-high wall to top within 6 minutes. If there was a tie, the climber with the fastest elapsed time won.

Route-setting 
Speed climbing wall is standardized: 15 meters tall, 5 degrees overhanging. Bouldering and lead climbing have route-setting teams.

The IFSC route-setters were Manuel Hassler (chief) from Switzerland and Adam Pustelnik (chief) from Poland, Romain Cabessut from France, Matthias Woitzuck from Austria, Martin Hammerer from Austria, and Remi Samyn from France.

The IFSC Technical Delegate was Fabrizio Minnino from Italy. The IFSC Jury President was Johannes Altner from Germany. The IFSC Judge was Paul Ledet from Canada.

Schedule

Participating nations 
44 climbers from 19 nations participated in the event. Athletes were invited based on the 2019 IFSC World Cup Combined Ranking and 2019 IFSC Climbing World Championships Combined Ranking. Athletes who were already qualified for the Olympics would not be invited.

 Host

Men

Women

References

Qualification for the 2020 Summer Olympics
2019 in sport climbing